Hossam Ashraf  (born 20 June 2001) is an Egyptian professional footballer who plays as a forward for Egyptian League club Zamalek.

Career statistics

References

External links
 

Living people
2001 births
Egyptian footballers
Association football forwards
Zamalek SC players